Ion Jardan (born 10 January 1990) is a Moldovan footballer who plays as a right-back for Petrocub Hîncești. He also plays for the Moldova national football team.

Club career
In 2013 Jardan signed a contract with Ukrainian Premier League side FC Arsenal Kyiv, but did not play any match for the main squad. After the bankruptcy of this club, in January 2014 he signed a deal with Romanian Liga I team FC Botoșani.

International career
On 14 June 2013 he made his debut for the Moldova national football team in a friendly match against Kyrgyzstan.

Honours
Zimbru Chișinău
Moldovan Cup: 2013–14
Moldovan Super Cup: 2014

Sheriff Tiraspol
Moldovan National Division: 2016–17, 2017
Moldovan Cup: 2016–17

Petrocub Hîncești
Moldovan Cup: 2019–20

References

External links

 

1990 births
Living people
Moldovan footballers
FC Rapid Ghidighici players
FC Zimbru Chișinău players
FC Arsenal Kyiv players
FC Sheriff Tiraspol players
CS Petrocub Hîncești players
Moldovan Super Liga players
Moldova international footballers
Moldovan expatriate footballers
Expatriate footballers in Ukraine
Association football defenders
Moldova under-21 international footballers
Moldovan expatriate sportspeople in Ukraine